, , and  are limited express train services operated by Kyushu Railway Company (JR Kyushu) which run from Hakata via Yufuin to Ōita and Beppu on the Kyudai Main Line.

Rolling stock
 KiHa 71 series DMU: 1989–present (Yufuin no Mori)
 KiHa 72 DMU: 1999–present (New Yufuin no Mori)
 KiHa 183-1000 DMU:
1992–1999 (Yufuin no Mori II)
2004–2011 (Yufu DX) Withdrawn 10 January 2011.
 KiHa 185 series DMU: 1992–present (Yufu)

Ekiben
The exclusive ekiben, Yufuin no Mori Bento, can only be purchased onboard this service. It contains Yufuin rice and vegetables, sesame tofu, and chicken miso.

See also
 Joyful Train

References

External links
 JR Kyushu

Named passenger trains of Japan
Kyushu Railway Company
Railway services introduced in 1989
1989 establishments in Japan